The following is a timeline of the history of the city of Bandar Abbas, Iran.

Prior to 20th century

 1514 – Portuguese in power; settlement named "Comorão".
 1614 – Shah Abbas the Great expels the Portuguese.
 1622
 Settlement renamed "Bandar Abbas".
 Bandar Abbas economy affected by capture of nearby Hormuz by Persian/English forces.
 1623 – Dutch East India Company trade mission established.
 1664 – French East India Company conducts business in town (approximate date).
 1727 – Town sacked by Afghan forces.
 1741 – "Cannon foundry" established.
 1762 – British and Dutch businesspeople relocate to Bushire.
 1790s – Population: 12,000 (approximate estimate).
 1793 – Bandar Abbas "leased to the sultan of Oman" (approximate date).
 1830 – Population: 5,000 (approximate estimate).
 1852 – Persians expelled the Muscat authorities.
 1868 – Salim bin Thuwaini expelled and Qajars in power.
 1872 – Gwadur-Jask-Bandar Abbas telegraph begins operating (approximate date).
 1879 –  (mosque) built.
 1892 –  (mosque) built.
 1900 – Population: 10,000. (approximate estimate).

20th century

 1902 – Earthquake.
 1925 –  (mosque) built.
 1930s – Population: 8,000 (approximate estimate).
 1947 – "Fish canning plant" built.
 1956 – Population: 17,710.
 1959 –  (bath house) refurbished.
 1966 – Population: 34,627.
 1967 – Deepwater port opens.
 1973 – "Iranian naval headquarters" relocated to Bandar Abbas from Khorramshahr.
 1976 – Population: 89,103.
 1982 – Population: 175,000 (estimate).
 1988 – 3 July: United States military shoots down civilian Iran Air Flight 655 in vicinity of Bandar Abbas during the Iran–Iraq War.
 1996 – Population: 273,578.

21st century

 2006 – Aluminium Hormozgan F.C. (football club) formed.
 2008
 10 September: 2008 Qeshm earthquake.
 (museum) opens.
 2010 – Takhti Stadium (Bandar Abbas) opens.
 2011 – Population: 435,751.
 2013 
 June: Local election held.
 Abbas Aminizadeh becomes mayor.
 2014 – City becomes part of newly formed national administrative Region 2.

See also
 Bandar Abbas history
 Other names of Bandar Abbas
 List of mayors of Bandar Abbas
 Hormozgan Province history
 Timelines of other cities in Iran: Hamadan, Isfahan, Kerman, Mashhad, Qom, Shiraz, Tabriz, Tehran, Yazd

References

This article incorporates information from the Persian Wikipedia.

Bibliography

External links

  (Bibliography)
 Items related to Bandar Abbas, various dates (via Europeana)
 

Years in Iran
Bandar Abbas
Bandar Abbas
bandar